Dimitrios Sandravelis (born 23 March 1990) is a Greek professional footballer who plays as a right-back for Super League 2 club Trikala.

References

1990 births
Living people
Greek footballers
Greek expatriate footballers
Cypriot First Division players
Football League (Greece) players
Gamma Ethniki players
Panegialios F.C. players
Trikala F.C. players
Ermis Aradippou FC players
A.E. Sparta P.A.E. players
PAE Kerkyra players
Association football defenders
Footballers from Patras